Arotrophora inthanona is a species of moth of the family Tortricidae. It is found in Thailand.

The wingspan is about 26 mm. The ground colour of forewings is brownish with a slight admixture of violet up to the middle and greyish in the posterior third of the wing. There are rust dots before the middle and there is brown reticulation (a net-like pattern) posteriorly. The markings are deep brown. The hindwings are pale brownish with an area of dark brown scent scales.

Etymology
The species name refers to Doi Inthanon, the type locality.

References

Moths described in 2009
Arotrophora
Moths of Asia